"Silver Age" was a twelve part storyline that ran through a series of one shot comic books published by DC Comics in 2000.

Each of the 12 issues was a one-shot (featuring issue #1 on the cover); however, they formed a larger story arc in which the Justice League of America fights the Injustice League formed by villain Agamemno.

The art, dialogue, narrative style and even the format of the comics (larger page-counts, half-page advertisements, etc.) were deliberately anachronistic for the time of publication; thus, the issues served as a tribute, and in some cases a gentle satire, to the books and creators of DC Comics during the Silver Age of Comic Books.

Issues 
All the issue titles were prefixed with "Silver Age", to distinguish them from the monthly series DC produced, even though only the Flash and Green Lantern were in print at the time (though starring later incarnations of the heroes). The current Justice League book was then titled JLA and Teen Titans was being published as simply 'The Titans'.

Silver Age 
by Mark Waid and Terry Dodson 
The spacefaring villain Agamemno travels to Earth where he finds Lex Luthor and explains his scheme for universal domination. The villain hopes to achieve his goal by combining three artifacts: the Absorbascon from Thanagar, a piece of jewel kryptonite and the Central Power Battery of the Green Lantern Corps on Oa.

It is explained that Agamemno needs the power of the JLA to collect these items (partially because two of them have these objects). With Luthor's advice, Agamemno assembles a team to oppose the Justice League (the Injustice League) and, using his powers, swaps the minds of the heroes and villains:

Lex Luthor swaps bodies with Superman, Chronos swaps bodies with the Atom, Black Manta swaps bodies with Aquaman,
Catwoman swaps bodies with the Black Canary, Doctor Light swaps bodies with the Martian Manhunter, Mr. Element swaps bodies with the Flash, the Penguin swaps bodies with Batman, Felix Faust swaps bodies with the Green Arrow, and Sinestro swaps bodies with Green Lantern.

The villains are promised Earth in exchange for aiding Agamemmno and, after imprisoning the Justice League, they split up and head off to collect the items.

The League manages to escape and, expecting the villains to return in their bodies, initiates a plan to discredit themselves. The deceived Snapper Carr contacts other (Silver Age) heroes to track down the "villains".

Silver Age: Justice League of America 
by Mark Millar and Scot Kolins 
The Injustice League, in the bodies of the JLA, split up and head into space to collect the items Aggammno requires. Catwoman (Black Canary), Sinestro (GL), Dr Light (Martian Manhunter) and Mr. Element (Flash) travel to Oa where, taking the Lanterns by surprise, they are able to destroy their power rings and steal the central battery.

Black Manta (Aquaman), Faust (the Green Arrow), Chronos (the Atom) and Luthor (Superman) travel to an alien planet where they discover a crashed ship that once belonged to Brainiac. Inside are a number of shrunken cites (similar to Kandor) one of which (Rikkon Dor) contains the jewel kryptonite. Chronos shrinks into the city and gets the kryptonite. He has a moment of conscience and wants to save the shrunken inhabitants (the Daxamites) but the rest of the villains smash the shrunken cities.

Silver Age: Challengers of the Unknown 
by Karl Kesel and Drew Johnson 
The Challengers get the call from Snapper Carr and hearing of a break-in at Ivy University by Chronos they head out. In the university the Atom (Chronos) is accessing a colleagues "time pool" to attempt to change the recent past. The Challengers attack the Atom, who uses his shrinking ray on them, but fails to stop their attack. In the middle of the fight Prof manages to deduce that Chronos is in fact Ray Palmer and the fight ends. Unfortunately strange creatures from the far future emerge from the time pool. These creatures incapacitate the Atom but the miniature Challengers triumph.

Fearing the Challengers will be destroyed before the Atom can enlarge them they are placed in the time pool where time will not pass for them. There they see their future selves (as seen in DC continuity). They also see a glimpse of strange heroes who will defeat the Injustice League. Once restored the Challengers (and the Atom) head off to find these heroes.

Silver Age: Teen Titans 
by Marv Wolfman and Pat Olliffe 
The Teen Titans (Robin, Aqualad, Kid Flash, Speedy and Wonder Girl) investigate claims that a small town sheriff is turning teenagers into zombies. Meanwhile, the Flash (Mr. Element), Batman (the Penguin) and Aquaman (Black Manta) are trying to track down the Titans to aid in their plight. The Titans go undercover and find the accusation to be true but end up captured by the villainous Sheriff Law. The heroes try to help but are ineffective in their new bodies and Batman is captured. The Titans escape the unique traps Law has devised to counter each of them by working together. Aquaman and the Flash arrive but the Titans refuse to believe their claims that they are their mentors and attack. Sheriff Law prevents the heroes from escaping by using his mind control technology to drive the Titans into an enraged state. Robin manages to regain his mind long enough for he and Batman to destroy Law's technology and the "villains" escape. Robin manages to contact Batman (actually the Penguin) and is convinced the heroes were lying.

Silver Age: Dial H for Hero 
by Mark Waid and Barry Kitson 
Robby Reed recounts his origin before joining a school field trip to a local Air Force base. The Martian Manhunter (Dr. Light) uses Light's power to create the illusion that the JLA has gone rogue and are attacking. Robby uses the H-Dial to transform and interferes but inadvertently reveals his identity to the Manhunter. The Martian Manhunter ultimately succeeds in his illusion and word is spread that the JLA are now evil.

Silver Age: Flash 
by Brian Augustyn, Ty Templeton and Norm Breyfogle 
The Flash (Mr. Element) uses Mr. Element's powers to create the illusion that the Flash has become a thief. Kid Flash and the Elongated Man team up to prove that Barry Allen is innocent. At a charity gala the Flash plans his big finale revealing he is now a villain but Kid Flash and the Elongated Man reveal that "Mr. Element" is behind the deception (thus foiling Barry's plan). This issue also features a story in which Barry Allen fights the Turtle.

Silver Age: Doom Patrol 
by Tom Peyer and Sergio Cariello 
Lex Luthor (actually Superman) makes a public statement that the JLA have become evil. The Chief uses a machine of his own invention that measures morality and seeing that Luthor is now good agrees to help him. Garguax and General Immortus have discovered Agamemno's plans as well as a cache of weapons belonging to Luthor that are designed to destroy the JLA. They hope to steal the weapons and use them against the Injustice Gang's new bodies to claim power for themselves. After meeting with "Luthor" the Doom Patrol decide to track down the weapons and the villains who have stolen them. The anti-JLA weapons prove effective against the Doom Patrol as well but with "Luthor's" aid they win the day and are convinced he is telling the truth that the JLA have gone bad.

Silver Age: The Brave and the Bold 
by Bob Haney and Kevin Maguire 
Will Magnus and The Metal Men are recruited by the U.S. Military to aid Batman (actually the Penguin) against Felix Faust (actually the Green Arrow) and Catwoman (actually the Black Canary). The Green Arrow hopes that he can use Faust's powers to swap their bodies back and goes to the Gotham City Library where the Metal Men attack. Magnus is injured in the resulting battle and Platinum (who is in love with him) carries him to safety. The Metal Men attack again but this time the Green Arrow unleashes a spell that transforms them into humans. Platinum visits the recovering Magnus but realises he loves his robots (not her) and convinces the others they need to be changed back. Magnus uses his science to return the Metal Men to normal and the robots again go after the "villains" but they escape, again using Faust's magic. Inexplicably the Penguin transforms back into his normal form.

Silver Age: Green Lantern 
by Kurt Busiek and Brent Anderson 
Agamemno and the Injustice League (still in the bodies of the JLA) travel to Thanagar where they use the League's reputation to get the Thanagarians to hand over the Absorbascon. However Sinestro (actually Green Lantern) attacks the League and does an excellent job of defeating them and Agamemno. In doing so he begins to become exceedingly violent and realises that without the yellow impurity of the Green Lantern Power Rings Sinestro's ring is driving him insane. Hal has a flashback to a battle with Sonar that inspires him to try a less 'head-on' approach. He enters the stolen Green Lantern Central Power Battery and uses his ring and the battery's power to restore the villains' (and thus the heroes') true forms. The villains escape and are confronted by the Green Lantern Corps in orbit but are able to shut down the minds of the Corps using the combined objects.

Silver Age: Showcase 
by Geoff Johns and Dick Giordano 
Deadman discovers the villains' plan and gathers Adam Strange, Gardner Grayle (Shining Knight), Batgirl, Mento, Metamorpho and Major Blackhawk to help him. They use Blackhawk's plane and Adam's Zeta Beam to travel to Rann and confront the Injustice League. They cannot however prevent Agamemno from assembling the items. When he does he is seemingly destroyed as Luthor replaced the jewel kryptonite with a diamond. The villains then take the power for themselves and head back to Earth. The Zeta beam fades and the team is returned to Earth as well.

Silver Age: 80-Page Giant 
by Mark Waid and Eduardo Barreto 
The JLA, now back in their regular bodies, are updated on the events that took place on Rann by Snapper Carr and the Seven Soldiers of Victory who have also recruited the Doom Patrol, the Metal Men, the Teen Titans and the Elongated Man to help. Having assembled the objects the Injustice League now possess the combined knowledge of everyone on Earth and use this information to defeat the combined heroes. The Martian Manhunter comes up with a plan and flies off while the rest of the JLA re-enter the fray. The Manhunter arrives in time to save the Heroes with Robby Reed's H-Dial. Transformed into heroes of which no one knows anything, The JLA are able to defeat the Injustice League. The victory is short-lived as Agamemno returns, his body now composed of the three combined weapons and more powerful than ever. Earth is saved at the last minute by a phalanx of Hawkmen and the Green Lantern Corps (it is revealed in flashback that they were saved by the combined efforts of Kid Flash, Deadman and Adam Strange). Agamemno is trapped inside the Central Power battery and the villains have the secrets they have stolen wiped by the Absorbascon. Robby Reed is proclaimed the hero of the day.

This issue also features four back-up stories: Batman fighting the Mad Hatter by E. Nelson Bridwell and Wayne Boring, Superman's Pal Jimmy Olsen with art by Pete Costanza (writer uncredited), a Wonder Girl (young Diana in this case) imaginary tale by Mark Waid and Ty Templeton and the origin story of Super-Turtle.

Silver Age: Secret Files and Origins 
This issue features a prequel to the above story in which Aggamemno finds out about the JLA and the villains that make up the Injustice Gang from Kanjar Ro and watches the Justice League fight Despero in his original form. The other stories include a Super-Turtle story, the Hawk and the Dove (Hank and Don Hall) teaming up with the Creeper and a Dial H for Hero story.

There are "true science facts" in the form of "Flash Facts", "Metal Men Facts and Fancies" and "Metamorpho's Chemical Curiosities". There is also a map of the original JLA Secret Sanctuary and a guide to the Cosmic Treadmill. This issue also contains behind the scenes information on the cover art of the series.

Effects 
The events of this story were referenced by Batman during the JLA storyline "Tower of Babel" as his reason for creating his contingencies against his teammates.

See also
The Golden Age, a DC Comics Elseworlds title set in the earlier era of comic books

Comics by Bob Haney
Comics by Geoff Johns
Comics by Kurt Busiek
Comics by Mark Millar
Comics by Mark Waid
Comics by Marv Wolfman